Utah County is the second-most populous county in the U.S. state of Utah. The county seat and largest city is Provo, which is the state's fourth-largest city, and the largest outside of Salt Lake County. As of the 2020 United States Census, the population was 665,665.

Utah County is one of two counties forming the Provo-Orem metropolitan statistical area, and is part of the larger Salt Lake City-Provo-Orem, UT Combined Statistical Area. In 2010, the center of population of Utah was in Utah County, in the city of Saratoga Springs.

Utah County is one of the fastest-growing counties in the United States, ranking among the top ten counties in numerical growth. Correspondingly, Provo-Orem is among the top eight metropolitan areas by percentage growth in the country.

Utah County is one of seven counties in the United States to have the same name as its state.  The other six counties are Arkansas County, Hawaii County, Idaho County, Iowa County, Oklahoma County and New York County (commonly known as Manhattan).

History
The legislature of the State of Deseret created a county on January 31, 1850, to govern the civic affairs of Utah Valley, which by the 1850s was bustling with newly arrived settlers. The county name is derived from the valley name, which is derived from the Spanish name (Yuta) for the Ute Indians. The State of Deseret dissolved soon after (April 5, 1851), but the counties it had set in place continued. There is little record of any official activity conducted by the fledgling county until April 18, 1852, when a full slate of county officials was published, and recordkeeping began. The first courthouse was built in central Provo in 1866–67. It was soon outgrown and was replaced by a second courthouse (1872–73). By the 1920s, this building was also cramped, and the decision was made to erect a combined city-county building, which was completed in 1926.

The county's boundaries were adjusted in 1852, 1854, 1856, 1862, 1880, and 1884. It has retained its present boundary since 1884.

Geography
Utah County terrain ranges from stiff mountain ranges in the east (the Wasatch Range), dropping steeply to a large lake-filled valley. Most of the comparatively level ground is dedicated to agriculture or developed uses, while most of the steep terrain is covered with arid-climate forestation. The county generally slopes to the west and north, with its highest point (Mt. Nebo in the southern part of the county), at 11,928' (3636m) ASL.

Utah Valley lies at the center of the county, lined by the mountains of the Wasatch Range on the east. Utah Lake occupies a large part of the valley.

Major highways

 Interstate 15
 U.S. Route 6
 U.S. Route 89
 U.S. Route 189
 Utah State Route 68
 Utah State Route 73
 Utah State Route 77
 Utah State Route 85
 Utah State Route 92
 Utah State Route 146
 Utah State Route 147
 Utah State Route 198

Adjacent counties

 Salt Lake - north
 Wasatch - northeast
 Duchesne - southeast
 Carbon - southeast
 Sanpete - south
 Juab - southwest
 Tooele - west

Protected areas

 Ashley National Forest (part)
 Black Hawk Campground (US Forest Service)
 Finish of the Provo River Parkway
 Manti-La Sal National Forest (part)
 Mount Timpanogos
 Powell Slough Waterfowl Management Area
 Rock Island Waterfowl Management Area
 Scofield State Park (part)
 Starvation Wildlife Management Area
 Timpanogos Cave National Monument
 Uinta-Wasatch-Cache National Forest (part)
 Utah Lake State Park

Lakes
 Utah Lake
 Provo Bay (an extension of Utah Lake)
 Scofield Reservoir (part)

Demographics

The 2000 census was the first to allow residents to select multiple race categories. Prior to 2000, the census used the category 'Other Race' as a catch-all identifier. For county-level census data in 1950 and 1900, Utah counted all non-White and non-Black residents using this category. 'Other races' formed 1.4% of Utah County's population in 1990, 0.43% in 1950, and 0.07% in 1900.

2020 census
As of the 2020 United States Census, there were 659,399 people and 171,899 households in the county. The population density was 329.12/sqmi (127.02/km2). There were 192,570 housing units, at an average density of 96.12/sqmi (37.1/km2). The county's racial makeup was 89.4% White, 0.5% Black or African American, 0.6% American Indian or Alaska Native, 1.4% Asian, 0.8% Native Hawaiian or other Pacific Islander, 4.6% some other race, and 2.7% from two or more races. 10.8% of the population were Hispanic or Latino of any race.

There were 140,602 households, out of which 47.7% had children under the age of 18 living with them, 69.9% were headed by married couples living together, 8.0% had a female householder with no husband present, and 18.7% were non-families. 11.6% of all households were made up of individuals, and 4.4% were someone living alone who was 65 years of age or older. The average household size was 3.57, and the average family size was 3.88.

The county's population was spread out, with 35.2% under the age of 18, 15.8% from 18 to 24, 28% from 25 to 44, 14.5% from 45 to 64, and 6.5% who were 65 years of age or older. The median age was 24.6 years. For every 100 females, there were 100.3 males. For every 100 females age 18 and over, there were 97.7 males.

At the 2000 census, the median income for a household in the county was $45,833, and the median income for a family was $50,196. Males had a median income of $37,878 versus $22,656 for females. The per capita income for the county was $15,557.  About 6.80% of families and 12.00% of the population were below the poverty line, including 8.40% of those under age 18 and 4.80% of those age 65 or over.

 Due to respondents reporting multiple ethnicities, percentages may add up to greater than 100%.

Religion

2000 census
As of the 2000 United States Census, there were 516,564 people, 140,602 households, and 114,350 families in the county. The population density was 258/sqmi (99.6/km2). There were 148,350 housing units, at an average density of 74.1/sqmi (28.6/km2). The county's racial makeup was 89.4% White, 0.5% Black or African American, 0.6% American Indian or Alaska Native, 1.4% Asian, 0.8% Native Hawaiian or other Pacific Islander, 4.6% some other race, and 2.7% from two or more races. 10.8% of the population were Hispanic or Latino of any race.

There were 140,602 households, out of which 47.7% had children under the age of 18 living with them, 69.9% were headed by married couples living together, 8.0% had a female householder with no husband present, and 18.7% were non-families. 11.6% of all households were made up of individuals, and 4.4% were someone living alone who was 65 years of age or older. The average household size was 3.57, and the average family size was 3.88.

The county's population was spread out, with 35.2% under the age of 18, 15.8% from 18 to 24, 28% from 25 to 44, 14.5% from 45 to 64, and 6.5% who were 65 years of age or older. The median age was 24.6 years. For every 100 females, there were 100.3 males. For every 100 females age 18 and over, there were 97.7 males.

At the 2000 census, the median income for a household in the county was $45,833, and the median income for a family was $50,196. Males had a median income of $37,878 versus $22,656 for females. The per capita income for the county was $15,557.  About 6.80% of families and 12.00% of the population were below the poverty line, including 8.40% of those under age 18 and 4.80% of those age 65 or over.

In 2005, the five most reported ancestries in Utah County were:
 English — 30%
 German — 10%
 Danish — 7%
 Mexican — 5%
 Scottish — 4%

Government

The government is a three-member elected county commission elected at-large. Other elected officials include the county sheriff, the county clerk, county recorder, county assessor, county surveyor, county treasurer, and the county attorney. The current county attorney is David Leavitt, younger brother of former Utah governor Mike Leavitt and son of Dixie Leavitt founder of The Leavitt Group and former Utah state senator. 

In 2020, Utah County voters rejected Proposition 9, which would have changed the county's government to a five-member elected county council with an elected county mayor.

The first sheriff of the county was John T. Willis, who was succeeded by William Madison Wall.  Alexander Williams served during John Cradlebaugh's court in 1859.  He was succeeded by Eli Whipple, who resigned in 1861 and was replaced by Russell Kelly. In 2020, Sheriff Mike Smith publicly stated he would not enforce COVID-19 face mask mandates.

The Utah County Fire Department provides emergency response to all unincorporated areas within Utah County and works with all the incorporated cities within the county plus all Utah state and federal lands. The department is primarily a wildland fires response and urban interspace service with some structure fire and HAZMAT abatement capability.

Politics
 

As the center of Mormon culture, Utah County has been referred to as "the most Republican county in the most Republican state in the United States". It has only voted for a Democratic president nine times since statehood, and has not supported a Democrat for president since 1964. Indeed, 1964 is the last time a Democratic presidential candidate has even managed 35 percent of the county's vote, and 1970 was the last time the county elected a Democratic U.S. Senator.

In the 1992 presidential election, George H. W. Bush received the most votes and Bill Clinton was third in votes received. In the 2004 presidential election, 85.99% voted for George W. Bush. In the 2008 U.S. presidential election, the county voted for John McCain by a 58.9% margin over Barack Obama, compared to McCain winning by 28.1% statewide. Eight other Utah counties voted more strongly in favor of McCain.  In the 2012 election, Mitt Romney received 88.32% of the vote. In the 2016 election, it gave a slim majority of the vote to Donald Trump, and over 30% of the vote to independent candidate Evan McMullin, who outperformed Hillary Clinton in the county. This was McMullin's largest share of the vote in any county in Utah and his second best nationwide after Madison County, Idaho. In 2020, Joe Biden received over 75,000 votes - the Democrats had never previously received more than 30,000 votes in the county. Indeed, he was the first Democrat to even win a quarter of the county's vote since 1976.

Until 2013, Utah County was represented entirely by one congressional district. Currently, the county is split between two congressional districts. Most of the county's population is in the 3rd District, represented by Republican John Curtis, former Provo Mayor. Much of the county's area however, including Utah Lake, resides in the 4th District currently represented by Republican Burgess Owens.

The county's Republican bent runs right through state and local politics. All five state senators representing the county, as well as all 14 state representatives, are Republicans. There are no elected Democrats above the municipal level.

Social issues
Utah County saw high rates of opioid and other prescription drug addiction from the mid-2000s onwards, foreshadowing the national opioid crisis. The 2008 documentary Happy Valley examined the problem.

Giving USA, which reports on charitable giving in the US, named Utah County as one of the three most generous counties in philanthropic donations, alongside San Juan County, Utah and Madison County, Idaho.

In 2019, one in eight people and one in six children in the county did not have sufficient food.

Infrastructure
Much of Utah's modern transportation infrastructure was built to support automobiles. Prior to the 1950s, Utah County relied on the U.S. Highway System for local transportation. When I-15 was built in 1956 (parallel to Highway 89), it became the dominant transportation vein in the state. The I-15 CORE project added multiple lanes on I-15 through most of Utah County. This expanded  of freeway and was completed in 2012. Other construction projects by UDOT have been done on I-15 since then, including the Technology Corridor project and the Point of the Mountain project. However, the highway system retains its significance in Utah County due to the mountainous terrain. Highway 6 is the closest major road connecting Colorado to the Wasatch Front, running through Spanish Fork Canyon before converging with I-15 in the city of Spanish Fork. Portions of Highway 89 have become prominent local roads known collectively as 'State Street'. Highway 189 is known as 'University Avenue' in the city of Provo, and runs through Provo Canyon into Heber in neighboring Wasatch County.

Utah County has seen significant growth in public transportation over the past 15 years, owing in part to the county's large student population of more than 70,000 commuting to-and-from Brigham Young University (BYU) in Provo and Utah Valley University (UVU) in Orem. The two cities jointly operate UTX, a bus rapid transit system, as part of their city bus routes. Provo also serves as the southernmost terminus of the FrontRunner, Utah's intrastate commuter rail service. The Provo FrontRunner station is located on South University Avenue, directly southwest of Amtrak's Provo Station--which is the third stop, after Green River and Helper, for the California Zephyr Amtrak route. In addition to Provo, The FrontRunner currently has three stops in the county. The Orem FrontRunner station is located on the west side of I-15, served by a pedestrian bridge over the freeway that connects the UVU campus directly to the station. An additional stop is under construction in Vineyard, Utah, and is estimated to be open by August 2022. Utah County also operates the American Fork FrontRunner Station and the Lehi FrontRunner Station located near Thanksgiving Point. From Lehi, the FrontRunner leaves Utah County and enters Salt Lake County.

Education

School districts
 Alpine School District
 Provo School District
 Nebo School District

Colleges and universities
Four-year institutions
 Brigham Young University (private)
 Utah Valley University (public)
 Provo College (private for-profit)
 Rocky Mountain University of Health Professions (private for-profit)

Two-year institutions
 Mountainland Technical College (public)

Communities

Cities

 Alpine
 American Fork
 Bluffdale (part)
 Cedar Hills
 Draper (part)
 Eagle Mountain
 Elk Ridge
 Highland
 Lehi
 Lindon
 Mapleton
 Orem
 Payson
 Pleasant Grove
 Provo (county seat)
 Salem
 Santaquin (part)
 Saratoga Springs
 Spanish Fork
 Springville
 Vineyard
 Woodland Hills

Towns

 Cedar Fort
 Fairfield
 Genola
 Goshen

Census-designated places

 Benjamin
 Elberta
 Hobble Creek
 Lake Shore
 Palmyra
 Spring Lake
 Sundance
 West Mountain

Unincorporated communities

 Birdseye
 Colton
 Soldier Summit (part)
 Vivian Park

Former communities

 Caryhurst (now within Provo city limits)
 Christmas City (area is now partially in Provo and partially in Orem)
 Dividend
 Forest City
 Homansville
 Ironton (now within Provo city limits)
 Leland (absorbed by Spanish Fork)
 Manila (former township, annexed by Pleasant Grove in 1998)
 Manning
 Mill Fork
 Mosida
 Thistle
 Tucker
 West Portal

See also
 National Register of Historic Places listings in Utah County, Utah

References

External links

Utah County official website
Utah County municipal election results 2021
Utah County Sheriff's Office

 
1850 establishments in Utah Territory
Populated places established in 1850